The following is a timeline of the history of the city of Lubbock, Texas, USA.

19th century

 1876 - Lubbock County established; named after Thomas Saltus Lubbock.
 1890 - Lubbock settlement formed by merger of Old Lubbock and Monterey.
 1891
 Lubbock designated seat of Lubbock County.
 Leader newspaper begins publication.
 Nicolett Hotel building moved to Lubbock from nearby North Town (approximate date).
 1900 - Lubbock Avalanche newspaper begins publication.

20th century

 1909
 Railroad begins operating.
 City of Lubbock incorporated.
 Frank E. Wheelock becomes mayor.
 1910 - Population: 1,938.
 1913 - Chamber of Commerce formed.
 1914
 South Plains Fair begins.
 St. Paul's-on-the-Plains Church established.
 1917 - Lubbock Sanitarium (hospital) and Mt. Gilead Baptist Church established.
 1920 - Population: 4,051.
 1924 - San Jose Catholic Church and Palace Theatre built.
 1925
 Texas Technological College opens.
 The Daily Toreador student newspaper begins publication.
 Rex Theatre in business.
 1926 - Texas Technological College Dairy Barn built.
 1929 - West Texas Museum established.
 1930
 Guadalupe School built.
 Population: 20,520.
 1931 - Lubbock High School built.
 1932 - KFYO (AM) radio begins broadcasting from Lubbock.
 1933
 Baptist Church established.
 Texan Theatre in business.
 1936
 September 7: Musician Buddy Holly born.
 Lubbock Lake Site archaeological remains discovered.
 1937
 South Plains Airport begins operating.
 Shaareth Israel Synagogue established.
 1940
 New Lindsey Theatre built.
 Population: 31,853.
 1941 - U.S. Army Flying School established near city.
 1942 - U.S. Army South Plains Flying School established.
 1943-1944 - Royal Air Force airmen cadets flew routinely to Lubbock on training missions from the RAF training base at Terrell, Texas.
 1945 - Chatman Hospital opens.
 1946
 Lubbock Symphony Orchestra formed.
 Plains Theatre in business.
 1949 - U.S. military Reese Air Force Base active.
 1950 - Population: 71,747.
 1951
 Regional "High Plains Water Conservation District #1" established.
 Country Club Drive-In cinema in business.
 1952 - KCBD-TV and KDUB-TV (television) begin broadcasting.
 1953 - KDAV radio begins broadcasting.
 1957 - Lubbock Christian College opens.
 1959 - Lubbock Avalanche-Journal newspaper in publication.
 1960 - Population: 128,691.
 1961 - South Plains Genealogical Society founded.
 1962 - San Jose Catholic Church rebuilt.
 1965 - Green Fair Manor apartment building constructed.
 1966 - City "urban renewal relocation housing project" completed.
 1969
 Lubbock State School opens.
 Texas Tech University School of Medicine and Lubbock Civic Ballet established.
 Preston Smith of Lubbock becomes Governor of Texas.
 1970
 May 11: 1970 Lubbock tornado.
 Population: 149,101.
 1977 - Lubbock Memorial Civic Center built.
1978 - May 19 Bombing at Faith Club Alcoholics Anonymous. Stevie Ray Vaughan played at Stubbs BBQ and AC/DC played at the Municipal Coliseum.
 1979 - Lubbock Heritage Society formed.
 1980 - Population: 173,979.
 1983 - Roman Catholic Diocese of Lubbock established.
 1990 - Population: 186,206.
 1998 – City website online (approximate date).
 2000 - Population: 199,564.

21st century

 2003 - Randy Neugebauer becomes U.S. representative for Texas's 19th congressional district.
 2008 - Tom Martin becomes mayor.
 2010 - Population: 229,573.
 2012 - Glen Robertson becomes mayor.
 2016 - Dan Pope becomes mayor.

See also
 Lubbock, Texas history
 List of mayors of Lubbock, Texas
 National Register of Historic Places listings in Lubbock County, Texas
 Timelines of other cities in the West Texas area of Texas: Abilene, Amarillo, El Paso, Midland

References

Bibliography

 
 
 Lawrence L. Graves, ed., A History of Lubbock (Lubbock: West Texas Museum Association, 1962)
 
 Lawrence L. Graves, ed., Lubbock: From Town to City (Lubbock: West Texas Museum Association, 1986)

External links

 
 
 
 Items related to Lubbock, Texas, various dates (via Digital Public Library of America).

 
Lubbock